Agrotis magnipunctata is a moth of the family Noctuidae. It is endemic to Buru and Seram.

References 

Agrotis
Moths of Indonesia
Moths described in 1922